Elyashiv (lit. God will bring back) is a moshav in central Israel.

Elyashiv may also refer to
Avrohom Elyashiv (c. 1877–1942), rabbi and Av Beis Din of the city of Gomel
Shlomo Elyashiv (1841–1926), kabbalist from Lithuania
Yosef Shalom Elyashiv (1910–2012), Israeli Haredi rabbi and posek